The Futurist Theatre was a theatre and cinema in Scarborough, North Yorkshire, England. It was located on Foreshore Road, on the sea front of the South Bay.

The theatre closed on 6 January 2014 after the operator's lease expired. The building was demolished by August 2018.

The Futurist was built as a cinema in 1921. It remained in this role until 1958 when the stage was extended to allow live performances at the venue. The Beatles performed there twice, on 11 December 1963 and on 9 August 1964. Extensions to the stage allowed the popular The Black and White Minstrel Show to perform there many times when it was owned (between 1966 and 1974) by Robert Luff, the producer of the stage version. The extension to the stage meant the closure of the adjacent Arcadia Theatre which became a lounge.

During the 1980s, Scarborough Borough Council took over the property and leased the theatre to Apollo Leisure Ltd (UK), who ran it until September 2002.

In December 2002, Barrie C. Stead, who also runs the Hollywood Plaza cinema, took over the Futurist and refurbished the theatre and cinema, installing new projectors, DTS sound system and a new CinemaScope screen.

Annually, the theatre predominately maintained consistent acts throughout the months of July and August.

The Futurist had the twelfth largest capacity (2,155) of a theatre in the country, and the fifth largest outside London.

In the winter of 2011, the Futurist managed to attract over 16,000 people during eight sell-out performances of Calendar Girls produced by David Pugh.

On 9 January 2017, Scarborough Borough Council voted to demolish the theatre, by the narrowest of margins (22-21). The decision was a controversial one, as not all the councillors voted, and many locals and visitors alike, would have preferred the venue to be saved, restored and modernised. The fate of the site is uncertain. However, interest has been shown from the Flamingoland group, who gave a large donation to the incumbent conservative party prior to the ramping up of the parties campaign to demolish the building. Demolition of the building began in June 2018  and was completed in August 2018.

Plans for a new Flamingo Land attraction on the site were revealed in February 2019. Gordon Gibb, Chief Executive of Flamingoland announced in January 2022, that the company had reluctantly withdrawn its interest in the site, due to differences in development plans between the company and the local council.

References

External links

 http://www.savethefuturist.co.uk/

Theatres completed in 1921
Cinemas in Yorkshire
Theatres in Scarborough, North Yorkshire